Elections to Adur District Council were held on 10 June 2004. The whole council was up for election with boundary changes since the last election in 2003 reducing the number of seats by 10. The Conservative Party held overall control of the council. Overall turnout was 38.0%.

Results

Ward results

References
Adur council. BBC News. 11 June 2004
Adur District Elections : 10 June 2004

2004
2004 English local elections
2000s in West Sussex